The thirteenth election to Glamorgan County Council, south Wales, took place in March 1925. It was preceded by the 1925 election and followed by the 1931 election.

Overview of the Result
Labour was defending a secure majority in an election that was more bitterly fought than in previous year, in the wake of divisions persisting after the General Strike and lockout of 1926. Non-Labour candidates largely coalesced under an Independent banner but lost further ground as Labour won additional seats

Boundary Changes
There were no boundary changes at this election.

Candidates
20 candidates  were returned unopposed, only five won whom were Labour.

Following the death of Dr T.H. Morris (Rhondda) there were ten retiring aldermen, nine of whom sought re-election. The only exception was Thomas Luther Davies (Aberaman).

Contested Elections
The pattern of contests was similar to 1925, although Labour did challenge some long-serving aldermen including W.R. Davies (first elected in 1898) at Cilfynydd and Enoch Davies in the Rhondda. In the Garw Valley ward, retiring alderman Rev. William Saunders was opposed by the sitting Independent councillor as was Alderman D.T. Williams in the Swansea Valley ward.

Outcome
Labour gained a number of seats, increasing their majority on the County Council.

A notable result in the Dulais Valley was the defeat of coal owner Daniel Daniels, former chairman of the Council, by Labour candidate Gwilym Davies. Daniels had not been re-elected as an alderman three years previously and the result came after a series of disputes in the mining industry.

In the Cilfynydd ward, Labour candidate Arthur Pearson defeated Alderman W.R. Davies, first elected to the council in 1898. Labour had won the seat in 1919 but in 1922 stood down to allow Davies to be returned unopposed. The decision to oppose him reflected the increasingly partisan politics of the mining valleys and Davies was narrowly defeated.

A similar situation arose in Treherbert, a seat won for Labour by D.E. Williams in 1919. Williams stood down in favour of Alderman Enoch Davies in 1922 but having been returned unopposed in 1925 he stood against Davies and was returned by several hundred votes. Enoch Davies had served as a member of the Council since 1901, and was a prominent tradesman and nonconformist.

Labour lost only two seats, at Penygraig in the Rhondda and also Pontardawe. The latter was significant as it was also represented by Alderman Dan Dai Davies, jailed for his role in the anthracite strike and disturbances of 1925. Labour consolidated their majorities in many others, including seats gained three years previously.

Results

Aberaman

Aberavon

Abercynon

Aberdare Town

Bargoed

Barry

Barry Dock

Blaengwawr

Bridgend

Briton Ferry

Cadoxton

Caerphilly

Cilfynydd

Coedffranc

Cowbridge

Cwm Aber

Cwmavon

Cymmer
In 1922 David Watts-Morgan had stood down in favour of retiring Liberal alderman Morgan Williams but by 1928 Williams had retired from public life.

Dinas Powys

Dulais Valley

Ferndale

Gadlys

Glyncorrwg

Gower

Hengoed

Hopkinstown

Kibbor

Llandaff

Llandeilo Talybont

Llanfabon

Llwydcoed

Llwynypia

Loughor

Maesteg, Caerau and Nantyffyllon

Maesteg, East and West

Mountain Ash

Neath (North)

Neath (South)
Davies failed to hold Neath South having stood down in favour of Alderman Hopkin Morgan in neighbouring Neath North.

Newcastle

Ogmore Valley
Six years previously, the SWMF candidate had defeated a railwaymen's nominee but that result was now reversed.

Penarth North

Penarth South

Pencoed

Penrhiwceiber

Pentre

Pontardawe

Pontyclun

Port Talbot East

Port Talbot West

Porthcawl

Pontlottyn
Hammond had previously been elected as a Liberal.

Pontycymmer

Pontypridd Town

Penygraig

Porth

Swansea Valley

Tonyrefail and Gilfach Goch

Trealaw

Treforest

Treherbert
Enoch Davies was defeated after 27 years after the sitting Labour councillor did not withdraw in his favour

Treorchy

Tylorstown

Vale of Neath

Ynyshir

Ystalyfera

Ystrad

Election of Aldermen

In addition to the 66 councillors the council consisted of 22 county aldermen. Aldermen were elected by the council, and served a six-year term. Following the 1928 election, there were eleven Aldermanic vacancies, all of which all of which were filled by Labour nominees despite the protestations of their opponents.

The following retiring aldermen were re-elected:
Hubert Jenkins (Lab, Cwm Aber)
Rev William Saunders (Lab, Garw Valley)
David Thomas Williams (Lab, Swansea Valley)

In addition, the following seven new aldermen were elected:

J.D. Brazell (Lab, Ystalyfera)
Jabez Davies (Lab, Rhondda)
Rhys Evans (Lab, Treorchy)
William Hammond (Lab, Pontlottyn)
W. Arthur Jones (Lab, Tonyrefail)
E.H. Mole (Lab, Newcastle)
Enoch Treharne (Lab, Rhondda)
David Watts-Morgan MP (Lab, Rhondda)

The following retiring aldermen were re-elected as members of the Council but were not re-elected as aldermen:

Hopkin Morgan (Lib, Neath)
Enoch Davies (Lib, Rhondda)
James Evans (Lib, Rhondda)

By-elections
Eleven vacancies were caused by the election of aldermen.

Cwm Aber by-election

Cymmer by-election
Following the election of David Watts-Morgan as alderman the by-election was won by the Independent candidate. Mrs Chalke was married to R.D. Chalke, headmaster of Porth Grammar School and the protective Liberal candidate for Rhondda East, then he was due to oppose Watts-Morgan.

Ferndale by-election

Garw Valley by-election
Jonathan Maddocks, the sitting Independent councillor, had been defeated by Alderman William Saunders at the regular election, and was again defeated by a Labour candidate.

Newcastle by-election
Following the appointment of E.H. Mole as alderman, the Rev. H.R. Jenkins, vicar of Penyfai, was elected to represent this ward.

Pontlottyn by-election

Swansea Valley by-election
Following the re-election of D.T. Williams as alderman, Richard Thomas, who had held the seat since 1922 but failed to hold on against Williams, regained the seat as an Independent.

Tonyrefail by-election

Trealaw by-election

Treorchy by-election
Following the election of Rhys Evans as alderman, David Hughes, checkweigher at Abergorki Colliery was elected as his successor.

Ystalyfera by-election
Following the election of J.D. Brazell as alderman, Daniel T. Jones of Cwmllynfell, who had held the seat from 1919 until 1922 was elected as his successor.

References

Bibliography

1928
1928 Welsh local elections
1920s in Glamorgan